Kerry Cathleen Kasik (born 1975) is a former American professional mixed martial artist. She competed in two professional fights, once for Strikeforce and once for Bellator Fighting Championships.

Kasik rose to fame as the winner of the Muay Thai-themed Fight Girls reality show on the Oxygen television network in 2007. She also appeared alongside many female mixed martial artists on the Ultimate Women Challenge reality show in 2009 .

Early life
Kerry is the second daughter born to real estate agents. She was enrolled in dance at an early age but through her love of Bruce Lee, she discovered Tae Kwon Do and was enrolled in classes at age six. Her older sister, Kelly Kasik is a professional ballroom dancer. Kerry also started entering amateur boxing contests when she was eighteen.

MMA career
Kasik made her mixed martial arts debut on May 15, 2009 at Bellator Fighting Championships 7 and defeated Leslie Smith by unanimous decision.

She later signed with Strikeforce and faced Kim Couture at Strikeforce Challengers: Woodley vs. Bears on November 20, 2009. Vera won the fight by TKO in the first round.

Vera was scheduled to face Julianna Pena at Strikeforce Challengers: Lindland vs. Casey on May 21, 2010 but pulled out of the fight due to an injury. She has not fought since.

Personal life
Kerry married MMA fighter Brandon Vera on February 5, 2006. In September 2014, Kerry filed for divorce from Brandon.

Mixed martial arts record

|-
| Win
| align=center| 2–0
| Kim Couture
| TKO (punches)
| Strikeforce Challengers: Woodley vs. Bears
| 
| align=center| 1
| align=center| 3:35
| Kansas City, Kansas
| 
|-
| Win
| align=center| 1–0
| Leslie Smith
| Decision (unanimous)
| Bellator VII
| 
| align=center| 3
| align=center| 5:00
| Chicago, Illinois
|

References

External links

See also
 List of female mixed martial artists

1975 births
American female mixed martial artists
Mixed martial artists utilizing Muay Thai
Mixed martial artists utilizing taekwondo
Mixed martial artists utilizing boxing
Living people
Place of birth missing (living people)
American women boxers
American female taekwondo practitioners
American Muay Thai practitioners
Female Muay Thai practitioners
21st-century American women